Reckless Love is the debut, self-titled album from Finnish glam metal band Reckless Love.

The album was released on 10 February 2010 on Spinefarm Records and entered the Finnish National Charts at number 13. The album was produced by Ilkka Wirtanen in the summer of 2009 at Hip Studios in Helsinki. The band re-released the album on 19 December 2010 with the subtitle "Cool Edition" which contained bonus tracks previously available only on the Japanese release and as single B-sides.

Reception
The album has received positive reviews from critics. William Clark of Guitar International wrote, "Reckless Love are just what glam metal fans across the globe have been waiting for: a band with a fresh sound, a standout lead vocalist, and some vivid retro ’80s influences".

Track listing

Personnel 
 Olli Herman – lead vocals
 Pepe Salohalme – guitar
 Hessu Maxx – drums
 Jalle Verne – bass

Singles 
 One More Time
 Beautiful Bomb
 Romance
 Badass [UK release]
 Romance [UK release]
 Back to Paradise

References 

2010 debut albums
Reckless Love albums
Spinefarm Records albums